Blush is the second and final studio album by Australian pop group Wa Wa Nee. Blush peaked at No. 32 in Australia. The album produced two top 40 singles in Australia.

Track listing

Track 11, "Tossing And Turning" is a bonus track and was only on the CD release of the album.

Charts

References

1989 albums
Wa Wa Nee albums
CBS Records albums